In statistics, maximum spacing estimation (MSE or MSP), or maximum product of spacing estimation (MPS), is a method for estimating the parameters of a univariate statistical model. The method requires maximization of the geometric mean of spacings in the data, which are the differences between the values of the cumulative distribution function at neighbouring data points.

The concept underlying the method is based on the probability integral transform, in that a set of independent random samples derived from any random variable should on average be uniformly distributed with respect to the cumulative distribution function of the random variable. The MPS method chooses the parameter values that make the observed data as uniform as possible, according to a specific quantitative measure of uniformity.

One of the most common methods for estimating the parameters of a distribution from data, the method of maximum likelihood (MLE), can break down in various cases, such as involving certain mixtures of continuous distributions. In these cases the method of maximum spacing estimation may be successful.

Apart from its use in pure mathematics and statistics, the trial applications of the method have been reported using data from fields such as hydrology, econometrics, magnetic resonance imaging, and others.

History and usage 
The MSE method was derived independently by Russel Cheng and Nik Amin at the University of Wales Institute of Science and Technology, and Bo Ranneby at the Swedish University of Agricultural Sciences. The authors explained that due to the probability integral transform at the true parameter, the “spacing” between each observation should be uniformly distributed. This would imply that the difference between the values of the cumulative distribution function at consecutive observations should be equal. This is the case that maximizes the geometric mean of such spacings, so solving for the parameters that maximize the geometric mean would achieve the “best” fit as defined this way.  justified the method by demonstrating that it is an estimator of the Kullback–Leibler divergence, similar to maximum likelihood estimation, but with more robust properties for some classes of problems.

There are certain distributions, especially those with three or more parameters, whose likelihoods may become infinite along certain paths in the parameter space. Using maximum likelihood to estimate these parameters often breaks down, with one parameter tending to the specific value that causes the likelihood to be infinite, rendering the other parameters inconsistent. The method of maximum spacings, however, being dependent on the difference between points on the cumulative distribution function and not individual likelihood points, does not have this issue, and will return valid results over a much wider array of distributions.

The distributions that tend to have likelihood issues are often those used to model physical phenomena.  seek to analyze flood alleviation methods, which requires accurate models of river flood effects. The distributions that better model these effects are all three-parameter models, which suffer from the infinite likelihood issue described above, leading to Hall's investigation of the maximum spacing procedure. , when comparing the method to maximum likelihood, use various data sets ranging from a set on the oldest ages at death in Sweden between 1905 and 1958 to a set containing annual maximum wind speeds.

Definition 
Given an iid random sample {x1, ..., xn} of size n from a univariate distribution with continuous cumulative distribution function F(x;θ0), where θ0 ∈ Θ is an unknown parameter to be estimated, let {x(1), ..., x(n)} be the corresponding ordered sample, that is the result of sorting of all observations from smallest to largest. For convenience also denote x(0) = −∞ and x(n+1) = +∞.

Define the spacings as the “gaps” between the values of the distribution function at adjacent ordered points:

Then the maximum spacing estimator of θ0 is defined as a value that maximizes the logarithm of the geometric mean of sample spacings:

By the inequality of arithmetic and geometric means, function Sn(θ) is bounded from above by −ln(n+1), and thus the maximum has to exist at least in the supremum sense.

Note that some authors define the function Sn(θ) somewhat differently. In particular,  multiplies each Di by a factor of (n+1), whereas  omit the  factor in front of the sum and add the “−” sign in order to turn the maximization into minimization. As these are constants with respect to θ, the modifications do not alter the location of the maximum of the function Sn.

Examples 
This section presents two examples of calculating the maximum spacing estimator.

Example 1 

Suppose two values x(1) = 2, x(2) = 4 were sampled from the exponential distribution F(x;λ) = 1 − e−xλ, x ≥ 0 with unknown parameter λ > 0. In order to construct the MSE we have to first find the spacings:

The process continues by finding the λ that maximizes the geometric mean of the “difference” column. Using the convention that ignores taking the (n+1)st root, this turns into the maximization of the following product: (1 − e−2λ) · (e−2λ − e−4λ) · (e−4λ). Letting μ = e−2λ, the problem becomes finding the maximum of μ5−2μ4+μ3. Differentiating, the μ has to satisfy 5μ4−8μ3+3μ2 = 0. This equation has roots 0, 0.6, and 1. As μ is actually e−2λ, it has to be greater than zero but less than one. Therefore, the only acceptable solution is

which corresponds to an exponential distribution with a mean of  ≈ 3.915. For comparison, the maximum likelihood estimate of λ is the inverse of the sample mean, 3, so λMLE = ⅓ ≈ 0.333.

Example 2 
Suppose {x(1), ..., x(n)} is the ordered sample from a uniform distribution U(a,b) with unknown endpoints a and b. The cumulative distribution function is F(x;a,b) = (x−a)/(b−a) when x∈[a,b]. Therefore, individual spacings are given by

Calculating the geometric mean and then taking the logarithm, statistic Sn will be equal to

Here only three terms depend on the parameters a and b. Differentiating with respect to those parameters and solving the resulting linear system, the maximum spacing estimates will be
 
These are known to be the uniformly minimum variance unbiased (UMVU) estimators for the continuous uniform distribution.

Properties

Consistency and efficiency 

The maximum spacing estimator is a consistent estimator in that it converges in probability to the true value of the parameter, θ0, as the sample size increases to infinity. The consistency of maximum spacing estimation holds under much more general conditions than for maximum likelihood estimators. In particular, in cases where the underlying distribution is J-shaped, maximum likelihood will fail where MSE succeeds. An example of a J-shaped density is the Weibull distribution, specifically a shifted Weibull, with a shape parameter less than 1. The density will tend to infinity as x approaches the location parameter rendering estimates of the other parameters inconsistent.

Maximum spacing estimators are also at least as asymptotically efficient as maximum likelihood estimators, where the latter exist. However, MSEs may exist in cases where MLEs do not.

Sensitivity 
Maximum spacing estimators are sensitive to closely spaced observations, and especially ties. Given

we get

When the ties are due to multiple observations, the repeated spacings (those that would otherwise be zero) should be replaced by the corresponding likelihood.

since .

When ties are due to rounding error,  suggest another method to remove the effects.
Given r tied observations from xi to xi+r−1, let δ represent the round-off error. All of the true values should then fall in the range . Cheng and Stephens suggest assuming that the rounded values are uniformly spaced in this interval, by defining

The MSE method is also sensitive to secondary clustering. One example of this phenomenon is when a set of observations is thought to come from a single normal distribution, but in fact comes from a mixture normals with different means. A second example is when the data is thought to come from an exponential distribution, but actually comes from a gamma distribution. In the latter case, smaller spacings may occur in the lower tail. A high value of M(θ) would indicate this secondary clustering effect, and suggesting a closer look at the data is required.

Moran test 
The statistic Sn(θ) is also a form of Moran or Moran-Darling statistic, M(θ), which can be used to test goodness of fit.
It has been shown that the statistic, when defined as

is asymptotically normal, and that a chi-squared approximation exists for small samples. In the case where we know the true parameter ,  show that the statistic  has a normal distribution with

where γ is the Euler–Mascheroni constant which is approximately 0.57722.

,
in which

and where  follows a chi-squared distribution with  degrees of freedom. Therefore, to test the hypothesis  that a random sample of  values comes from the distribution , the statistic  can be calculated. Then  should be rejected with significance  if the value is greater than the critical value of the appropriate chi-squared distribution.

However, the test statistic to be used requires the addition of a bias correction term and is:

where  is the number of parameters in the estimate.

Generalized maximum spacing

Alternate measures and spacings 

Multivariate distributions 
 discuss extended maximum spacing methods to the multivariate case.

See also 
 Kullback–Leibler divergence
 Maximum likelihood
 Probability distribution

Notes

References

Citations

Works cited 

 
  Note: linked paper is an updated 2001 version.
 
 
 
 
 
 
 
 
 
 

Estimation methods
Probability distribution fitting